Anton "Toni" Breder (18 November 1925 – 5 August 1989) was a German athlete. He competed in the men's long jump at the 1952 Summer Olympics, representing Saar.

References

External links
 

1925 births
1989 deaths
Athletes (track and field) at the 1952 Summer Olympics
German male long jumpers
Olympic athletes of Saar
Place of birth missing
Saar athletes